Băbiciu is a commune in Olt County, Oltenia, Romania. It is composed of a single village, Băbiciu.

The commune is located in the southeastern part of the county, on the right bank of the Olt River.

References

Communes in Olt County
Localities in Oltenia